The following is a list of the 469 communes of the Hautes-Pyrénées department of France.

The communes cooperate in the following intercommunalities (as of 2020):
Communauté d'agglomération Tarbes-Lourdes-Pyrénées
Communauté de communes Adour Madiran (partly)
Communauté de communes Aure Louron
Communauté de communes des Coteaux du Val d'Arros
Communauté de communes de la Haute-Bigorre
Communauté de communes Neste Barousse
Communauté de communes Pays de Nay (partly)
Communauté de communes du Pays de Trie et du Magnoac
Communauté de communes du Plateau de Lannemezan
Communauté de communes Pyrénées Vallées des Gaves

References

Hautes-Pyrenees